Leontopodium jacotianum is a species of plant in the family Asteraceae. It is native to Bhutan, China, India, Myanmar and Pakistan.

References

jacotianum